The Max Planck Institute for Social Anthropology (German: Max-Planck-Institut für ethnologische Forschung)  is a scientific research institute founded in 1999 in Halle, Germany. It is one of the institutes of the Max Planck Society.

Organization
The institute consists of five departments and several independent research institutes.

Law and Anthropology
Headed by Prof. Dr. Marie-Claire Foblets, the Department of Law and Anthropology was established in 2012 to focus on the effects of societies and cultures towards law and politics and vice versa. This department also carefully looks how scholars of this specific discipline can and should take responsibility for implications surrounding the interplay of these societal factors.

Resilience and Transformation in Eurasia
Headed by Prof. Dr. Chris Hann, the Department of Resilience and Transformation in Eurasia is concerned with the interaction of economics, politics and anthropology within Eurasia. Research sub-groups are focusing and have done studies on kinship, historical anthropology, economic anthropology, urban anthropology, culture and socialism, and citizenship.

Anthropology of Politics and Governance
Headed by Prof. Dr. Ursula Rao, the Department of Anthropology of Politics and Governance brings together a group of successful scholars undertaking research in form of in-depth case studies in Asia, Africa and Europe about the tactics, strategies, and motivations that shape political action in times of perceived crisis to study programmes and initiatives that aim to shape the future by proposing new ways of managing complexity and caring for relations in a more-than-human world.

Anthropology of Economic Experimentation
Headed by Prof. Dr. Biao Xiang, the Department of Anthropology of Economic Experimentation focuses on a wide range of political economy issues, including state-society relations, labour, social reproduction, and mobility governance, through the lens of migration.

Integration and Conflict
Formerly headed by retired Prof. Dr. Günther Schlee, the discontinued Department of Integration and Conflict focused on social systems particularly based on identification and differentiation among groups. The department looked into the holistic elements that build ethnic identity through kinship, friendship, language, history, religion, and how ethnicity plays a role across social systems at individual and supra-individual levels.

Management
The Max Planck Institute for Social Anthropology is mainly represented by the following people:

Directors
 Prof. Dr. Marie-Claire Foblets
 Prof. Dr. Ursula Rao
 Prof. Dr. Biao Xiang

Fellow
 Burkhard Schnepel

Services
 Bettina Mann (Research Coordinator)
 Anja Neuner (Head Librarian)

Controversies
In January 2017, the Department of Law and Anthropology has invited the controversial American activist and political scientist Norman Finkelstein as a visiting scholar. The Max Planck Institute for Social Anthropology has thus been criticized for providing a platform for a controversial speaker. In a statement the Max Planck Institute said that the purpose of Finkelstein's invitation to the Institute was to engage in a dialogue with him to discuss his work within an academic context. The research institute is dedicated to basic research where controversy cannot be ruled out; controversy is a “trait of academic work”.

References

External links
 Homepage of the Max Planck Institute for Social Anthropology

Research institutes established in 1999
Anthropological research institutes
Social anthropology
Social Anthropology
1999 establishments in Germany